Vigorón is a traditional Nicaraguan dish. It consists of a cabbage salad (chopped cabbage, tomatoes, onions, and chili pepper marinated in vinegar and salt), boiled yuca, and chicharrones (fried pork belly or fried pork rinds), all wrapped in a banana leaf.  This dish is often eaten without utensils, and it is frequently served to visiting family and guests, as it is generally easily and quickly prepared.

Dr. Alejandro Barberena Pérez, in his 1971 book "Granada," stated that María Luisa Cisneros Lacayo, "La Loca," developed the recipe in 1914 in Granada, Nicaragua, and she named the dish Vigoron after seeing a poster advertising an early 20th-century medicinal tonic by that name (USPTO Serial 71068023).

Many familial and cultural variants have arisen, especially in the variations of curtido. In addition, variants of vigorón exist in other surrounding countries, notably Costa Rica, where the dish is quite popular.

Vaho, a dish very similar to vigorón, is also a traditional Nicaraguan dish. However, a distinction is made in the manner of cooking:  vaho is pressure-cooked (typically brisket), vigorón is not.   Vaho also has green and ripe plantains, whereas Vigorón does not.

See also
Nicaraguan cuisine

References

External links
 Vigoron Recipe

Nicaraguan cuisine